Ian Kirkby is a British actor and writer. He is best known for his role as DI Harry Batt on the children's programme Dick and Dom in da Bungalow  Diddy TV' Sandy Swashbuckle.

 Career 
In his early years, Kirkby became a member of the Central Junior Television Workshop. From there he was selected as an extra in 1987 in ITV sitcom, Hardwicke House. In 1992, Kirkby graduated from the Royal Academy of Dramatic Art and was employed in a number of minor roles in theatre and television productions. He also spent a year with the Royal Shakespeare Company and performed in the West End. In 2003, Kirkby was hired by the BBC to play Newcastle detective, Harry Batt on CBBC's Dick and Dom in da Bungalow. Kirkby said he based the character of Harry Batt on a "Seventies Sweeney stereotype, but with a Geordie accent." The character was only intended to be a one-time appearance; however, the character became popular so Kirkby reprised the role as a recurring character and a regular actor until the end of the programme in 2006. Kirkby also played Harry Batt in Da Dick and Dom Dairies and The Legend of Dick and Dom. During this time, he also co-wrote a programme for CBBC based around Harry Batt, which was broadcast in 2007.

Also in 2006, in a role that Kirkby was permitted to write for himself, played the role of Mr. Burgess in the talent programme The Slammer. In 2010, Kirkby was hired by Channel 4 to play commentator Terry McIlroy in the comedy Pete versus Life''.

Personal life 
Kirkby is a fan of association football; however, he had expressed a dislike of motor racing as "just a waste of petrol".

Filmography

Television

Films

References

External links 

Living people
Year of birth missing (living people)
English male television actors
Alumni of RADA
Royal Shakespeare Company members
English male stage actors
English male film actors